Riding Alone for Thousands of Miles is a 2005 drama film directed by Zhang Yimou and starring Ken Takakura. It premiered at the Tokyo International Film Festival on 22 October 2005 and was released in China on 22 December.

Written by Zou Jingzhi, the film tells the story of Gouichi Takata (Takakura), an aged Japanese father who, ever since his wife died, has not been in good terms with his son. When he learns that his son has been diagnosed as having liver cancer, he decides to travel to Yunnan province in  China in his son's place to film Riding Alone for Thousands of Miles, a traditional item in the local nuo opera (傩戏), of which his son is a leading scholar. The father hopes that by doing so, he might finally gain the forgiveness of his son.

The title of the film is an allusion to the fabled story of Guan Yu's perilous solo journey to reunite with his sworn brother and lord Liu Bei, as told in the Romance of the Three Kingdoms. It is a story about brotherly love and loyalty much told in Chinese folklore and operas. The film draws the parallel between the folk tale and Takata's quest to fulfill his son's wish.

Plot
Takata Gouichi (played by Ken Takakura), an elderly Japanese man, has been on poor terms with his son Kenichi (Kiichi Nakai) since the death of his wife. When his son falls ill, Gouichi travels from the province of Akita to the hospital, located in Tokyo, but his son refuses to see him. Kenichi's wife Rie (Shinobu Terajima) gives Gouichi a video-tape so that Gouichi may learn more about his son, which contains footage of Li Jiamin, an artist of Nuo opera from the Province of Yunnan of the People's Republic of China, promising to perform Riding Alone for Thousands of Miles in a year. Gouichi decides to travel to the PRC in his son's place to film Li's performance.

Gouichi arrives in the Village of Li, near the City of Lijiang, only to learn that Li was imprisoned after assaulting someone for mocking his illegitimate son. His translator Jiang Wen and the local guide Qiu Lin suggest that he film someone else, but Gouichi insists on Li. After an uncertain and time-consuming process of obtaining clearances from authorities, Gouichi gains entry to the prison facility, but Li breaks down in tears because he misses his son too badly. Gouichi decides to travel to Stone Village to retrieve Li's 8-year-old son Yang Yang (Yang Zhenbo), whose mother is revealed to have died shortly before Gouichi's visit to the prison. While in the village, Gouichi receives a call from Rie, telling him that Kenichi has been touched by his efforts, and requests that he come home. Gouichi wonders whether the message really was from Kenichi, and opts to continue his mission.

On the way to the prison, the vehicle breaks down, and Yang Yang chooses to run away, being filled with anxiety at meeting a father whom he doesn't remember. Gouichi chases after the boy, and the two become lost in the limestone hills, having no choice but to sleep in a cave. Yang Yang is hostile toward Gouichi at first, but trusts him as the hours pass by. They are found the next morning by the combined efforts of villagers and the police. Gouichi feels that Yang Yang's opinion should be respected, and lets him go home. Shortly after, he receives another call from Rie, informing him that Kenichi has died, leaving behind a letter saying that he has forgiven his father.

Gouichi returns to the prison with photographs of Yang Yang. Li is moved and promises to give his best performance. As he, the musicians, and the supporting actors are about to begin, he asks why Gouichi isn't recording. Gouichi explains that, since his son has passed, recording is no longer necessary. Li, however, persuades him to record anyway, given their difficulty in coming all this way, and so the performance begins in view of the camera.

The film revolves around the meaning of Gouichi's journey, and brings in issues of performance and duplicity, the authenticity or its lack in tourist experience, and the way in which success abroad can seem to erase failure at home.

Cast
 Ken Takakura as Gouichi Takata (Japanese and T. Chinese: 高田剛一, S. Chinese: 高田刚一, Hepburn: Takata Gōichi, Pinyin: Gāotián Gāngyī), an aged Japanese father who travels to China in a quest to seek forgiveness from his son Kenichi.
 Shinobu Terajima as Rie Takata (高田理恵 Takata Rie, Gāotián Lǐhuì), Kenichi's wife.
 Kiichi Nakai as Kenichi Takata (高田健一 Takata Ken'ichi, Gāotián Jiànyī), Gouichi's son. Kiichi Nakai lends his voice to this role, who never makes an appearance in the film.
 Li Jiamin as Li Jiamin (李加民, Pinyin: Lǐ Jiāmín, Hepburn: Rī Jāmin): Li acts as himself, a local Nuo Opera artiste from Yunnan province of China.
 Jiang Wen as Jiang Wen (蒋 雯, Jiǎng Wén, Jan Wen) (also known as Jasmine in the English script): Jiang acts as a translator named after herself (she is a tour guide in real life).
 Qiu Lin as Qiu Lin (邱 林, Qiū Lín, Chū Rin) (also known as Lingo in the English script): Qiu acts as a local guide named after himself (he is a real-life tour guide from the Naxi village region).
 Yang Zhenbo as Yang Yang (S. Chinese: 杨杨, T. Chinese and Japanese: 楊楊, Yángyáng, Yanyan), the eight-year-old illegitimate son of Li.
 The drama is performed by the Guizhou Anshun City Zhanjiatun Sanguo Drama Team.

Reception

Awards and nominations
 San Diego Film Critics Society Awards, 2006
 Best Foreign Language Film
 Best Actor — Ken Takakura
 Hong Kong Film Awards, 2007
 Best Asian Film

DVD release
Riding Alone for Thousands of Miles was released on DVD on 6 February 2007 and distributed in the United States by Sony Pictures Classics. The DVD features the original Chinese / Japanese audio track, as well as dubbings in French and Portuguese, with English, Spanish, French and Portuguese subtitles. The DVD also contains The Making of Riding Alone for Thousands of Miles as a special feature.

References

External links
 Theatrical trailer for Riding Alone for Thousands of Miles
 
 
 
 
 
 Interview with Zhang Yimou about Riding Alone for Thousands of Miles
 Riding Alone for Thousands of Miles review originally published by Think.com.my

2005 films
2005 drama films
Japanese drama films
2000s Japanese-language films
2000s Mandarin-language films
Films set in Yunnan
Films directed by Zhang Yimou
Sony Pictures Classics films
Chinese drama films
Films with screenplays by Zou Jingzhi
Films about Chinese opera
Films scored by Guo Wenjing